KDUB-LP is a low power radio station broadcasting out of Watsonville, California.

History
KDUB-LP began broadcasting on December 27, 2014.

References

External links
 

Watsonville, California
2015 establishments in California
DUB-LP
DUB-LP
Radio stations established in 2015